The Electricity Regulatory Authority (ERA) is a government agency that regulates, licenses, and supervises the generation, transmission, distribution, sale, export, and importation of electrical energy in Uganda.

Location
The offices of the ERA are located in the New ERA House at 5C-1 Third Street, Lugogo Industrial Area, Kampala Central Division, in the country's capital city. The coordinates of New ERA House are 0°19'18.0"N 32°36'18.0"E (Latitude:0.321667; Longitude:32.605000).

Overview
ERA was established in 2000, in accordance with the Electricity Act of 1999, as an agency of the Uganda Ministry of Energy, Oil and Mineral Development. This parastatal is governed by a five-member board, also known as the "Authority". The day-to-day affairs of the agency are supervised by the chief executive officer. Organizations and committees within the purview of the ERA include the Rural Electrification Board and the Electricity Consumer Committees.

Operations
One of the responsibilities of the agency is the issuance of licenses to electricity wiremen/wirewomen in Uganda, who totaled nearly 2,000 as at November 2018. A member of the Authority also chairs a 5-person Installations Permit Committee, which s responsible for interviewing applicants for installation permits, processing of new permits, renewal of permits and undertaking disciplinary measures against permit holders who  violate the terms and conditions of their permits.

Governance
The authority is supervised by a board of directors, chaired by Richard Santo Apire. The chief executive officer of the authority is Engineer Ziria Tibalwa Waako.

Recognition and awards
In December 2021, the annual African Development Bank’s 2021 Electricity Regulatory Index selected Uganda's electricity sector as the best-regulated on the African continent, for the fourth consecutive year. By extension, Uganda's Electricity Regulatory Authority is the best electricity sector regulator in Africa, for four years running, according to the AfDB.

See also
Umeme
Irene Muloni
Ruth Nankabirwa
Energy in Uganda
List of power stations in Uganda
Electricity Regulatory Authority House
Energy Regulators Association of East Africa

References

External links

Uganda
Regulatory agencies of Uganda
Electric power in Uganda
Government agencies established in 2000
Organisations based in Kampala
2000 establishments in Uganda